The qualifying play-off of the 2014 AFC Champions League was played from 29 January to 15 February 2014, to decide four of the 32 places in the group stage.

Format
The bracket for the qualifying play-off was determined by the AFC based on the association ranking of each team, with teams from the higher-ranked associations entering at later rounds. Teams from the same association may not play each other in the qualifying play-off. Each tie was played as a single match, with the team from the higher-ranked association hosting the match. Extra time and penalty shoot-out were used to decide the winner if necessary. The winners of each tie in round 3 advanced to the group stage to join the 28 automatic qualifiers. All losers of each round from associations with only play-off slots entered the AFC Cup group stage.

Teams
The following 19 teams (11 from West Zone, 8 from East Zone) were entered into the qualifying play-off:

Schedule
The schedule of the competition was as follows.

Bracket

West Zone

East Zone

Round 1

|-
|+West Zone

|+East Zone

|}

West Zone

East Zone

Round 2

|-
|+West Zone

|+East Zone

|}

West Zone

Notes

East Zone

Round 3

|-
|+West Zone

|+East Zone

|}

West Zone

East Zone

References

External links
AFC Champions League, the-AFC.com

1